Park Seung-hwan was a Korean major, war hero and independence activist of the Korean Empire. After his suicide, he was known for organizing the Battle of Namdaemun as a response to the Japan–Korea Treaty of 1907 and the abdication of Emperor Gojong.

Biography
He was born on September 7, 1869, in Hanseong, Gyeonggi as the eldest of three children of Park Joo-pyo and Namyang Hong. During his education at the academy, Yi Hak-gyun, the principal of the academy was nationalist opposing Japanese influences, shaped Park a nationalist soldier. He graduated on March 21, 1897, and was commissioned as a Second-Lieutenant in the Imperial Korean Guards. Afterwards, on November 11, 1899, he was promoted to the rank of lieutenant in the army and was appointed as the platoon commander of the 2nd Battalion of the 1st Siwi Regiment and on July 23, 1900, he was promoted to the rank of captain and took the command of the 1st company of the 1st Qinwi Regiment. Then on 14 August 1900 he took the command of company leader of the 1st Siwi Regiment. On 15 February 1904, Park was promoted to Major and became the 1st Battalion leader of 1st Siwi Regiment.

While serving as the 1st Battalion Commander of the 1st Siwi Regiment, he entered the palace when Emperor Gojong was forcibly taken away by the Japanese in 1907 and attempted to restore the throne, but he stopped because he was afraid of harm to King Gojong. On August 1, 1907, he gathered officers above a battalion commander or higher at the Japanese military headquarters to disband the army. Park then committed suicide with a pistol and wrote a suicide letter which read:

When Park's suicide became known, some of the soldiers of the 1st Chamryeong under him became enraged and started an anti-Japanese uprising, which lead to the Battle of Namdaemun. After the battle was put down, the Imperial Japanese government defamed Park's suicide. In 1909, An Jung-geun assassinated Itō Hirobumi at Harbin Station to avenge Park's death.

Legacy
After his death, in 1962, he was posthumously awarded the Presidential Order of Merit for National Foundation by the Government of South Korea. In August 2003, he was selected as the national figure of South Korea.

Family
Park had a son named Park Jeong-hup and he had 2 grandchildren, Park Dae-jong and Park Wang-jong.

References

Bibliography

1869 births
1907 deaths
People from Seoul
Suicides by firearm in Korea
Korean independence activists
Imperial Korean military personnel
1907 suicides